Hammatoderus is a genus of longhorn beetles of the subfamily Lamiinae, containing the following species:

 Hammatoderus albatus (Bates, 1880)
 Hammatoderus antonkozlovi Botero & Santos-Silva, 2017
 Hammatoderus brunneus (Dillon & Dillon, 1941)
 Hammatoderus colombiensis (Constantino, Benavides & Esteban-Durán, 2014)
 Hammatoderus confusor (Dillon & Dillon, 1941)
 Hammatoderus decorus (Chemsak & Linsley, 1986)
 Hammatoderus elatus (Bates, 1872)
 Hammatoderus emanon (Dillon & Dillon, 1941)
 Hammatoderus garciaorum Santos-Silva & Botero, 2018
 Hammatoderus granulosus (Bates, 1885)
 Hammatoderus inermis (Thomson, 1857)
 Hammatoderus juliae Botero & Santos-Silva, 2017
 Hammatoderus laceratus (Bates, 1885)
 Hammatoderus lacordairei (Thomson, 1860)
 Hammatoderus lingafelteri Botero & Santos-Silva, 2017
 Hammatoderus lunaris (Bates, 1880)
 Hammatoderus maculosus (Bates, 1880)
 Hammatoderus migueli Botero & Santos-Silva, 2017
 Hammatoderus nitidus (Bates, 1874)
 Hammatoderus olivescens (Dillon & Dillon, 1941)
 Hammatoderus ornator (Bates, 1885)
 Hammatoderus pollinosus (Bates, 1880)
 Hammatoderus rubefactus (Bates, 1872)
 Hammatoderus sallei (Thomson, 1860)
 Hammatoderus sticticus (Bates, 1874)
 Hammatoderus thiodes (Bates, 1880)
 Hammatoderus thoracicus (White, 1858)
 Hammatoderus wappesi Santos-Silva & Botero, 2018

References

Lamiini
Cerambycidae genera